The National Democratic Alliance is a political party in Malawi. 
At the last general elections, 20 May 2004, the party won 8 out of 194 seats.

Political parties in Malawi